The Day Christ Died is a 1980 American television film directed by James Cellan Jones. The collaborative production by 20th Century Fox and CBS-TV dramatizes the last 24 hours of Jesus Christ's life and is based on Jim Bishop's 1957 book of the same name. The book was co-adapted by James Lee Barrett, who, 15 years prior, had scripted The Greatest Story Ever Told for George Stevens.

Bishop, who did not accept the adaptation, had his name removed from the credits. He called the film "cheap revisionist history", and even tried unsuccessfully to change the film's title. The Day Christ Died was filmed in Tunisia, at a cost of US$2.8 million. It was broadcast by CBS-TV on Wednesday, March 26, 1980.

Plot  
Around the same time that a popular mob hero named Barabbas is arrested and convicted by Pontius Pilate and his lieutenant governor/aide Tullius, Jesus of Nazareth arrives in Jerusalem in time for the celebration of the Passover/Seder. The High Priest Caiaphas and the Sanhedrin, who oppose and find Jesus to be a menace and danger to their traditions, scarcely bargain with Pilate on how to detain Jesus. This ideas initially goes well with Pilate since he fears a riot from a mob clamoring for Barabbas release. When Jesus is finally condemned by the Sanhedrin and handed over to Pilate, he uses him as a decoy or alternative to please the Jerusalem populace by acquitting Barabbas and sentencing Jesus to be crucified in his place.

Cast 
Chris Sarandon     as	Jesus Christ
Colin Blakely	as	Caiaphas
Keith Michell	as      Pontius Pilatus
Jonathan Pryce     as	Herod Antipas
Barrie Houghton	as	Judas
Tim Pigott-Smith	as	Tullius
Jay O. Sanders	as	Simon Peter
Eleanor Bron	as 	Mary
Delia Boccardo	as	Mary Magdelene
Hope Lange	        as 	Claudia (Pontius Pilate's wife)
Oliver Cotton	as 	John
Rod Dana           as      Abenadar
Gordon Gostelow	as	Nicodemus
Nando Paone as Thaddeus
Samuele Cerri as Nathaniel
Leonardo Treviglio

References

External links

1980 television films
1980 films
Films shot in Tunisia
CBS network films
Portrayals of Jesus on television
Film portrayals of Jesus' death and resurrection
Portrayals of the Virgin Mary in film
Cultural depictions of Judas Iscariot
Cultural depictions of Pontius Pilate
Films scored by Laurence Rosenthal
Films with screenplays by Edward Anhalt
Portrayals of Mary Magdalene in film
Cultural depictions of Saint Peter
Films directed by James Cellan Jones
1980s English-language films